Wąwolnica  is a village in Puławy County, Lublin Voivodeship, in eastern Poland. It is the seat of the gmina (administrative district) called Gmina Wąwolnica.

The village has a population of 1,041.

The local football team is Wąwolnica KS Wawel Castle.

People associated with Wąwolnica 
 Józef Gosławski (1908-1963) - Polish sculptor and medal artist. He spent his childhood and also the occupation years in Wąwolnica.
 Stanisław Gosławski (1918-2008) - Polish sculptor and author of many works of decorative arts. He was born in Wąwolnica on 7 September 1918.

Legendary origins
According to legend, around the seventh century AD (some sources mention that it was probably 721) Prince Krak came from Kraków. Visiting the area, he found the site of the current Wąwolnica, which he named Wąwelnica - from the name of his home (Wawel). The coat of arms of the town shows St. George (Prince Krak was believed to have slain the Wawel Dragon).

History
Wąwolnica is one of the oldest settlements in Lesser Poland (initially as part of the  Sandomierz voivodeship, and later in the Lublin voivodeship). Together with Bochotnica it formed the heart of the local administrative unit. A manuscript stored at the Holy Cross monastery on Łysa Góra states: "In 1027 the Fathers of our monastery parish ministry did newly establish and newly convert to the Holy Faith the Wawelnica settlement." Traces of occupation go back to the Stone Age.

 In the 13th century there already was a fortified town lying on a major highway leading from the commercial crossings on the Vistula river near present-day Kazimierz Dolny, via Rzeczyca, Wąwolnica to Lublin.
 The parish chronicle has preserved a written record of mediaeval local history: "Haunted was the year 1278 for the Polish. The Tatar onslaught flooded it all. Lublin was devastated as most of the others were, then, in rushed legions on barbaric raids, set-up their main camp, and kept bringing in fresh blood dripping booty. Hundreds of thousands of unfortunate prisoners were destined to be slaves for the Khan." This event marks the beginning of the cult of the Virgin Mary of Kębło.
 Before 1370, the village received its town charter and became a royal town. The castle (royal tower), the royal chapel of the church of St. Adalbert, and the defensive wall (to a thickness of 3 meters) were built. The reign of king Casimir the Great was considered Wąwolnica's heyday.
 In 1409 Władysław II Jagiełło granted Wąwolnica 
the privilege of a market.
 From 1444, castellan court proceedings were held in Wąwolnica by the Castellan of Lublin.
 In 1448 there was a change in the town’s legal status with the adoption of the Magdeburg law.
 In 1458 king Casimir IV Jagiellon gave the parish to the Benedictines of the Holy Cross, who took over the patronage of the city and parish. The patronage expired in 1819 after the annulment of the law, the right of patronage over the parish went to Prince Adam Jerzy Czartoryski.
 In the 16th century courts were held by the Governor for the nobility of Lublin.
 In 1567 Wąwolnica was completely burnt. King Sigismund II Augustus ordered the Lublin voivode Jan Firlej to rebuild it, and so the city was moved to its new (present) location.
 In 1638, the church for the Benedictine monastery was consecrated, converted from the former royal chapel.
 From the 17th century the city declined severely, then was subsequently destroyed by the armies of Russia, Sweden, and Saxony.
 In 1795 Wąwolnica became part of the Austrian partition of Poland.
 From 1809 it belonged to the Duchy of Warsaw, and from 1815 to the Congress Kingdom of Poland.
 In 1819, the monastery was dissolved.
 In 1820, Wawolnica was down to 132 wooden houses and 4 brick houses, with 1,034 residents.
 In 1870, the Tsarist authorities deprived Wąwolnica of civic rights as an act of reprisal for assisting the January Uprising.
 In 1921, 1,043 Jews, representing 35% of the total population, lived in Wąwolnica.
 In September 1939, Germany invaded Poland beginning World War II, and occupied Wąwolnica.  They robbed and brutalized the Jewish population which had been around 900 before the war.  In 1941, they confined them to a ghetto and conscripted many for forced labor. In March 1942, the SS took about 120 Jews to the cemetery and murdered them. Later in the month, the rest of the Jewish community was forcibly deported to Opole from where they were taken to the Bełżec death camp a few days later and murdered there. Only a few dozen of Wąwolnica's Jews survived the German occupation.
 In 1946, on 2 May, the village was burnt down by the UB for fostering the anti-communist underground. 101 homes, 106 barns, 121 cowsheds, 120 pigsties and other farm buildings were burned, many of them along with the livestock. Two people died in the fires, one person died of a heart attack, and many were injured. By accident, the event was witnessed and photographed by John Vachon, a professional American photographer with the UNRRA mission in Poland, who happened to be travelling through the area. His photographs remained unpublished for decades and were only released after his death in 1975.

March 1942 massacre and the Jewish cemetery

On 22 March 1942, Nazis gathered all the Jewish men from Wąwolnica and Nałęczów in the main square of Wąwolnica and murdered them. The women had to carry the bodies and bury them in the Jewish cemetery.

Today only few tombstone fragments remained in the cemetery.

In 1993, Sara Tregerman-Ryterski (1917-2011), whose father and brothers were murdered in the massacre, built a monument at the cemetery to commemorate the event. The monument contains inscriptions in Polish and Hebrew. The Polish inscription is a dedication to the eternal memory of the victims and to one of the men who raised from the bodies around him, pleaded to spare his life and in return was shot dead. The inscription in Hebrew is a dedication to the victims of the Tregerman family, whom she carried and buried in the cemetery: Her father David and her brothers Abraham Hirsch, Refael Mordechai and Pesach Noah.

Notable buildings

The present parish church of St. Adalbert was built in 1907—1914. The church was designed by K. Drozdowski in the "neo-Vistula" style, with three naves in red brick. In 2001 Pope John Paul II raised the church to the status of minor basilica. A church has been present on the site since the 11th century. 

Next to the church, in the presbytery of what remains of the old church, there is a statue of Virgin Mary of Kębło - the object of special veneration and numerous pilgrimages.

Tourism

Wąwolnica is located on the edge of the Kazimierz Landscape Park, between the major tourist centers of Puławy, Kazimierz Dolny and Nałęczów.

The Wąwolnica route passes through on the historic narrow-gauge Nałęczowskiej Commuter Rail. Tourist trains run on the route.

References

Villages in Puławy County
Lesser Poland
Lublin Governorate
Lublin Voivodeship (1919–1939)